Seaton McLean is a Canadian film and television producer. He co-founded Atlantis Films. He oversaw all production activity for the Atlantis Films Limited, producing television series like White Fang, Traders, Earth: Final Conflict, Kurt Vonnegut's Welcome to the Monkey House, The Ray Bradbury Theater, PSI Factor and The Eleventh Hour.

References

External links 
 

Canadian film producers
Canadian television producers
Living people
Year of birth missing (living people)
Queen's University at Kingston alumni
Place of birth missing (living people)